The Star of Gallantry (SG) is a military decoration awarded to personnel of the Australian Defence Force (ADF) and other persons recognised by the Minister for Defence. It is awarded for acts of great heroism or conspicuous gallantry in action in circumstances of great peril. It is the second highest of the military gallantry awards in the Australian Honours System, only surpassed by the Victoria Cross or Victoria Cross for Australia (VC).

Background
The SG was introduced on 15 January 1991, replacing the Imperial equivalents, (the Distinguished Conduct Medal and the Conspicuous Gallantry Medal Air and Naval), as second level awards to Other Ranks and ratings. The SG also replaced the Distinguished Service Order, in its role as an award to officers for gallantry. The SG has no rank requirements and all service personnel are eligible. The UK equivalent is the Conspicuous Gallantry Cross (CGC) and the US equivalents are the Distinguished Service Cross, Navy Cross and Air Force Cross.

Recipients of the Star of Gallantry are entitled to use the post-nominal letters "SG". Recipients of the award are normally announced in the Commonwealth of Australia Gazette. Since its inception eight awards have been made.

Government allowance
The Veteran's Entitlements Act 1986 Section 102 specifies that the Repatriation Commission may grant an allowance of A$2.10 per fortnight to veterans, serving members of the Australian Defence Force, and members of Peacekeeping Forces who have been awarded the Star of Gallantry, or other "eligible decorations" specified in Section 102.

Description
 The Star of Gallantry is a gold-plated silver Federation Star ensigned with the Crown of Saint Edward. The obverse displays a smaller Federation Star, which is surrounded by stylised flames. This image represents action under fire.
 The reverse shows a horizontal panel superimposed on a stepped background.
 The medal is suspended from a 32 millimetre-wide ribbon by a narrow bar, which is engraved with the words "For Gallantry". The ribbon has a design of chevrons of light orange alternating with chevrons of deep orange angled at 60 degrees.

Recipients
Since its inception, eight awards of the Star of Gallantry have been made:

 On 26 November 2006, a soldier identified only as Sergeant A from 4RAR (Commando) became the first recipient of the Star of Gallantry. Sergeant A was awarded the medal for his actions whilst assisting with the extraction of threatened coalition forces in Orūzgān Province, Afghanistan. The medal was presented by Governor General Michael Jeffery.
 On 18 August 2008, Lieutenant Colonel Harry Smith was awarded the decoration for his leadership and gallantry during the Battle of Long Tan in the Vietnam War. Smith was originally recommended for the Distinguished Service Order following the battle, but this was subsequently downgraded to the Military Cross. The award of the Star of Gallantry to Smith came as a result of several years of campaigning to the Australian Government resulting in an independent review which recommended the award.
 On Australia Day 2010, special forces soldier Private S received the Star of Gallantry "for acts of conspicuous gallantry in action in circumstances of great peril while a lead scout in Afghanistan in 2008": "Private S' gallantry ensured the safety of his team, neutralised the enemy and achieved mission success. Private S, as the lead scout of his team, was heavily engaged at close quarters with automatic fire and rocket propelled grenades by a well armed and determined insurgent force. He displayed complete disregard for his personal safety by moving to an exposed firing position in order to fire and throw grenades to suppress enemy within 30 metres of his position. His selfless act enabled the rest of his team to fire and manoeuvre to regain the initiative and neutralise the enemy. His efforts are in the finest traditions of the Australian Army and the Australian Defence Force."
 On Australia Day 2011, special forces soldier Sergeant P received the Star of Gallantry "For acts of conspicuous gallantry in action in circumstances of great peril while on Operation SLIPPER in Afghanistan" in June 2010 during the Shah Wali Kot Offensive.
 On 13 June 2011, special forces soldier Sergeant D was awarded the Star of Gallantry in the 2011 Queen's Birthday Honours for "conspicuous gallantry in circumstances of great peril" while serving with the Special Operations Task Group.
 On 13 June 2011, special forces soldier Private S was awarded the Star of Gallantry in the 2011 Queen's Birthday Honours for "conspicuous gallantry in circumstances of great peril" while serving with the Special Operations Task Group.
 On 9 June 2014, special forces soldier Private B was awarded the Star of Gallantry for "conspicuous gallantry in action in circumstances of great peril while on operations on Operation SLIPPER".
 On 17 July 2017, Captain Raymond Jesse Allsopp was awarded the Star of Gallantry for gallantry during Operation Oboe Two in World War II. A Medical Officer, Allsopp served with the 2/5th Commando Squadron and was killed in action at Balikpapan, on 1 July 1945. The award was made 72 years after Allsopp's death following a review by the Defence Honours and Awards Appeals Tribunal, which upgraded his previously awarded Mention in Despatches to a Star of Gallantry.

References

External links
 It's an Honour

1991 establishments in Australia
Courage awards
Military awards and decorations of Australia
Awards established in 1991